Chinese Jews may refer to:

History of the Jews in China
History of the Jews in Taiwan
Kaifeng Jews